Sixteen ships of the Royal Navy have borne the name HMS Wolf or HMS Woolf, after the mammal the wolf:

 was a 16-gun ship, previously the Spanish Lobos. She was captured in 1656 and sold in 1663.
 was an 8-gun fireship launched in 1690 and expended in 1692, destroying the French 
 was a 2-gun sloop launched in 1699. She was captured by the French in 1704 but was recovered in 1708 and sold in 1712.
 was a 14-gun sloop launched in 1731 and wrecked in 1741.
 was a 14-gun sloop launched in 1742, captured by the French in 1745, recaptured in 1747 and wrecked in 1748.
 was a 10-gun sloop launched in 1754 and sold in 1781.
 was an 8-gun armed ship of unknown origin, wrecked in 1780.
 was a 4-gun gunvessel, originally a Dutch hoy purchased in 1794. She was broken up in 1803.
HMS Wolf was a 16-gun sloop, originally the 18-gun French privateer .  captured her in 1798 and the Royal Navy commissioned Eugénie as HMS Pandour. She was renamed HMS Wolf in 1800 and broken up in 1802.
 was a cutter tender launched in 1801 and broken up in 1829.
 was a 16-gun  launched at Dartmouth in 1804. She captured or destroyed four small Spanish or French privateers before she was wrecked on 4 September 1806, with no loss of life, about 1.5 miles off shore on the southwest point of Heneaga in the Bahamas. The loss was blamed on a northward current and inaccurate charts.
HMS Wolf was the French 16-gun brig-sloop Diligent, which  captured in 1806. She was renamed HMS Prudente later that year and HMS Wolf in 1807. She was broken up in 1811.
 was a 14-gun brig-sloop launched in 1814 and sold as a training ship in 1825.
 was an 18-gun sloop launched in 1826, hulked in 1848, used as a coal hulk from 1859 and broken up by 1878.
 was an  wooden screw gunboat launched in 1856 and broken up by 1864.
 was an  launched in 1897, reclassified as a  destroyer in 1913 and sold in 1921.

See also

References
 
 Fonds Marine. Campagnes (opérations; divisions et stations navales; missions diverses). Inventaire de la sous-série Marine BB4. Tome premier : BB4 210 à 482 (1805-1826) 

Royal Navy ship names